The World Junior Alpine Skiing Championships 2016 were the 35th World Junior Alpine Skiing Championships, held between 25 February and 5 March 2016 in Sochi, Russia.

Medal winners

Men's events

Women's events

Team event

External links
World Junior Alpine Skiing Championships 2016 results at fis-ski.com

World Junior Alpine Skiing Championships
2016 in alpine skiing
Alpine skiing competitions in Russia
2016 in Russian sport
Sports competitions in Sochi